Greatest Hits is the first compilation album by American rapper Pimp C. It was released on May 6, 2008 through Rap-A-Lot Records.

Track listing

Charts

References

External links

Pimp C albums
2008 greatest hits albums
Compilation albums published posthumously
Rap-A-Lot Records compilation albums